Cromartie or Cromarty may refer to:

People

Sport
 Antonio Cromartie (born 1984), American football cornerback
 Da'Mon Cromartie-Smith (born 1987), American football safety
 Marcus Cromartie (born 1990), American football cornerback
 Russell Cromarty (born 1947), Australian rules footballer
 Warren Cromartie (born 1953), US baseball player
 Dominique Rodgers-Cromartie (born 1986), American football cornerback

Others
 Ann Yearsley née Cromartie (1753–1806), English poet and writer
 Arthur Cromarty (1919–2014), US jurist
 Cromartie Sutherland-Leveson-Gower, 4th Duke of Sutherland (1851–1913), a.k.a. Lord Sutherland-Leveson-Gower, Earl Gower and the Marquess of Stafford
 George Cromarty (1941–1992), US folk guitarist and singer
 James H. Cromartie (born 1944), US artist (painter)
 Magnus Cromarty (1875–1925), Australian politician

Places

Canada
 Cromarty, Manitoba
 Cromarty railway station
 Cromarty, Ontario
 Cromarty Tennis Club, Nova Scotia

Scotland
 Cromarty, a town and civil parish in Ross and Cromarty
 Cromarty dialect, of the above area
 Cromarty (Parliament of Scotland constituency) (1661–1672)
 Cromarty Firth, an arm of Moray Firth in Scotland
 Cromarty Bridge, over the above firth
 MV Cromarty Rose, a ferry that serviced the firth
 Cromartyshire, a historic county around the town of Cromarty

Other
 List of Terminator: The Sarah Connor Chronicles characters#Cromartie, a fictional television character
 Cromartie High School, a Japanese comedy manga (2001–2006) and anime television series (2003–2004)
 Cromartie High – The Movie (2005), a live-action, feature-length adaptation of the above manga
 Cromarty and Dingwall Light Railway, a defunct railway line in the Highlands of Scotland
 Cromartyshire (UK Parliament constituency) (1708–1832)
 Dennis Franklin Cromarty High School, Thunder Bay, Ontario, Canada
 Earl of Cromartie, a hereditary title created for the Mackenzie family
 Easley v. Cromartie, a 2001 US Supreme Court case (532 U.S. 234)
 Hunt v. Cromartie, a 1999 US Supreme Court case (526 U.S. 541)